Lasioglossum bidentatum, also known as the Lasioglossum (Sudila) bidentatum, is a species of bee in the genus Lasioglossum, of the family Halictidae. The species is mispellingly known as specific name bidendatum in some books.

References

 https://www.academia.edu/7390502/AN_UPDATED_CHECKLIST_OF_BEES_OF_SRI_LANKA_WITH_NEW_RECORDS
 https://www.scribd.com/doc/99128133/Faunal-taxonomy-book-Sri-Lanka#scribd
 http://dl.nsf.ac.lk/bitstream/handle/1/7656/CJS(B.S)-34-27.pdf.txt;jsessionid=23171642212BA61782CA5A4186421A76?sequence=3
 https://portals.iucn.org/library/efiles/documents/2006-030.pdf

Notes

bidentatum
Insects described in 1913